The women's 800 metres event at the 2003 Summer Universiade was held in Daegu, South Korea on 27–30 August.

Medalists

Results

Heats

Semifinals

Final

References
Results

Athletics at the 2003 Summer Universiade
2003 in women's athletics
2003